Meall a' Phubuill (774 m) is a peak in the Northwest Highlands, Scotland, northwest of Fort William in Lochaber.

A rounded and grassy hill, it stands at the head of Glen Loy, in a little visited area covered by grass and heather moorland. Despite this, the summit ridge is steep.

References

Mountains and hills of the Northwest Highlands
Marilyns of Scotland
Corbetts